Laun is the German spelling of Louny in the Czech Republic. It may also refer to:

 Alfred A. Laun Jr. (1905–1964), American politician
 Friedrich Laun (1770–1849), pseudonym of Friedrich August Schulze, German novelist
 Henri van Laun (1820–1896), Dutch writer, translator and teacher
 Nikolaus von Laun (c. 1300 – 1371), German friar and scholar